Loading may refer to:

Biology
 Carbohydrate loading, a strategy employed by endurance athletes to maximize the storage of glycogen in the muscles
 Creatine loading, a phase of use of creatine supplements
 Vocal loading, the stress inflicted on the speech organs when speaking for long periods

Engineering
 Application of a structural load to a system
 Disk loading, the pressure maintained over the swept area of a helicopter's rotor
 Seismic loading, one of the basic concepts of earthquake engineering
 Wing loading, the loaded weight of an aircraft divided by the area of its wing
 Loading characteristic, a measure of traffic on a telephone system
 Insertion of an electrical load into a circuit
 Use of a loading coil to increase inductance
 Loading (computing), the process in which the contents of a file are read into a computer's memory

Other uses
 Task loading, the number of tasks taken on by a diver
 Loading (TV channel), a Brazilian TV Network focused on pop and geek culture

See also
 Lading
 Load (disambiguation)
 Loaded (disambiguation)
 Loader (disambiguation)